Yang Shoujing (1839 – 9 January 1915) was a Chinese antiquarian, bibliophile, calligrapher, diplomat, geographer, and historian. He is best known for the historical atlas Lidai yudi tu, commonly called the Yangtu ("Yang's atlas"), the most complete and scholarly historical atlas of China produced during the Qing dynasty. He devoted most of his life to the annotation of the 6th-century geographic work Shui jing zhu, which was completed by his disciple Xiong Huizhen and published as the Shui jing zhu shu.

As a Qing diplomat posted in Japan, Yang purchased tens of thousands of ancient Chinese books from Japanese libraries and archives, many of which had become rare or lost in China. After his death, the government of the Republic of China purchased his collection and preserved most of the books in the National Palace Museum.

Yang was an accomplished calligrapher of the Stele School and became highly influential in Japan. The introduction of his art was said to have "offered virtually an unprecedented aesthetic style" to Japan and "revolutionized" Japanese calligraphy. Yang's former residence and tomb in Yidu, Hubei are now protected as a Major National Historical and Cultural Site of China.

Biography

Yang was born in 1839, during the Qing dynasty, in Lucheng Town, Yidu County, Hubei Province. His courtesy name was Xingwu. After passing the provincial examination and earning the juren degree in 1862 (first year of the Tongzhi reign), he lived for ten years in Beijing trying to pass the imperial examination for the highest jinshi degree, without success. Although he failed the examinations, he became friends with the prominent officials Pan Zuyin and Zhang Zhidong, who shared his passion for antiques. He attended Pan's lavish parties and shopped for antiques in Beijing's Liulichang with Zhang.

From a young age Yang was interested in geography, and spent much of his life annotating Li Daoyuan's 6th-century work Commentary on the Water Classic (Shui Jing Zhu). His knowledge in geography earned him a diplomatic post to Japan, despite his repeated examination failure. In Tokyo he worked under the career diplomat Li Shuchang, an abrasive superior who nevertheless appreciated Yang's knowledge in antiques. As Japan was quickly westernizing during the Meiji Restoration, traditional Chinese publications fell out of fashion and were sold cheaply. Working with Li as well as Japanese antiquarians, Yang purchased tens of thousands of old Chinese books preserved in Japanese collections, many of which had become rare or even lost in China. They were later published as Guyi congshu. After Yang's death, the Republic of China government purchased his collection and preserved most of his books in the National Palace Museum.

Yang was posted in Japan from 1880 to 1884. In 1909 he served as an advisory official of the Ministry of Rites. He died in Beijing on 9 January 1915, and was buried in his hometown Yidu.

Annotation of the Commentary on the Water Classic
Yang devoted most of his lifetime to the annotation of the Commentary on the Water Classic (Shui jing zhu). He wrote 40 volumes of annotation but died before completing the work. His disciple Xiong Huizhen carried on the project and wrote another 40 volumes of annotation. It was published in the 1950s as the Shui jing zhu shu. The influential historian Gu Jiegang remarked that the work "brought to a point of culmination the textual research of The Classic of Waterways of the previous three centuries." He greatly admired the authors' "single-minded devotion" to the task, and Xiong's devotion to his master.

Historical atlas of China
Another of Yang's important works is the Lidai yudi tu, his historical atlas of China which is often simply called the Yangtu (Yang's atlas). Yang began the work in 1866 with the assistance of Deng Yongxiu, and was joined by Rao Dunzhi in the late 1870s. They plotted historical geographical data on a Qing dynasty map,  but left out non-Han Chinese kingdoms such as Nanzhao and Dali. Published between 1906 and 1911, it was the most complete and scholarly historical atlas of China produced during the Qing dynasty. Based on Yang's atlas, historian Tan Qixiang compiled The Historical Atlas of China, which was published in the 1980s and is considered the most authoritative atlas of Chinese history ever published.

Calligraphy

With the encouragement of Pan Zuyin, Yang became an accomplished calligrapher of the Stele School of Chinese calligraphy. When he went to Japan, he introduced the style to Japanese calligraphers, offering them "virtually an unprecedented aesthetic style" and revolutionizing Japanese calligraphy. He was considered a talented artist by famous Japanese calligraphers such as Miyajima Seiichiro, Kusakabe Meikaku, Iwaya Osamu, and Matsuda Sekka.  and others bought hundreds of sheets of Yang's works. Yang wrote many essays on the Stele School of calligraphy, which were published by Japanese scholars in two volumes, Ping bei ji ("Record of stelae criticism") and Ping tie ji ("Record of model-letters criticism").

Memorials
In September 1986, the government of Yidu city repaired Yang Shoujing's tomb and former residence, which was turned into the Yang Shoujing Museum. His residence and tomb are now protected as a Major National Historical and Cultural Site of China (designation 6-995).

Notes

References

1839 births
1915 deaths
19th-century Chinese historians
20th-century Chinese historians
Artists from Hubei
China–Japan relations
Chinese antiques experts
Chinese bibliophiles
Chinese epigraphers
Chinese expatriates in Japan
Chinese historical geographers
Historians from Hubei
Qing dynasty calligraphers
Qing dynasty diplomats
Qing dynasty historians
People from Yichang
Republic of China calligraphers
Republic of China historians